Jelena Ivezić (born 17 March 1984 in Slavonski Brod, SFR Yugoslavia) is a Croatian female basketball player. At the 2012 Summer Olympics, she competed for the Croatia women's national basketball team in the women's event. She is 6 ft 1 inches tall.

References

External links
Profile at eurobasket.com

Croatian women's basketball players
Croatian expatriate basketball people in Turkey
1984 births
Living people
Sportspeople from Slavonski Brod
Olympic basketball players of Croatia
Basketball players at the 2012 Summer Olympics
ŽKK Gospić players
ŽKK Partizan players
Small forwards
Mediterranean Games bronze medalists for Croatia
Competitors at the 2009 Mediterranean Games
Mediterranean Games medalists in basketball